Dryophytes immaculatus, the spotless tree toad or Chinese immaculate treefrog, is a species of frog in the  family Hylidae endemic to China. The natural habitat of the species has been generally transformed into rice fields and it is threatened by habitat loss.

The species has very strongly declined in population size of the last decades, similarly to the sister species Dryophytes suweonensis and Dryophytes flaviventris.

References

Amphibians described in 1888

immaculatus
Taxonomy articles created by Polbot
Amphibians of Korea